Cheryl Elizabeth Henshilwood (born 1 August 1952) is a New Zealand former cricketer who played primarily as a right-handed batter. She appeared in one Test match and two One Day Internationals for New Zealand. Her sister, Linda Lindsay, also played international cricket for New Zealand, and the two played together at the 1978 World Cup in India. She played domestic cricket for Wellington.

References

External links
 
 

1952 births
Living people
Cricketers from Wellington City
New Zealand women cricketers
New Zealand women Test cricketers
New Zealand women One Day International cricketers
Wellington Blaze cricketers